Clube Atlético Tubarão is a Brazilian football team from Tubarão, Santa Catarina, Brazil, founded on April 14, 2005 as Associação Cultural, Recreativa e Esportiva Atlético Cidade Azul but changed to Club Atlético Tubarão name in 2007, and to the current name in 2009.

History

In 2005 Cidade Azul competed in the Série B1 (Divisão de Acesso) from Campeonato Catarinense 2005. The team won the first stage, but lost in semifinals of Final Phase and qualified to Divisão Especial from Campeonato Catarinense 2006.

In 2006, the club finished in 11th placed in Divisão Especial and relegated to Divisão de Acesso 2007.

In 2007, the team won the first and second stage of Divisão Acesso from Campeonato Catarinense 2007 and qualified to Divisão Principal from Campeonato Catarinense 2008.

In 2008, after a bad campaign in First Stage of Campeonato Catarinense 2008, the team finished the Second Stage in 4th placed, the championship in 9th placed and it remained in Divisão Principal.

In 2009, the team made a bad campaign in Campeonato Catarinense 2009, finishing in last placed and relegated to Divisão Especial 2010. They changed their name to Associação Cultural Recreativa e Esportiva Atlético Cidade in that year.

Current squad

Achievements
 Campeonato Catarinense Divisão de Acesso:
 Winners (1): 2007

 Copa Santa Catarina:
 Winners (1): 2017

References

Association football clubs established in 2005
Football clubs in Santa Catarina (state)
2005 establishments in Brazil